Albert Tubilandu Ndimbi (15 March 1948 – 17 June 2021) was a Congolese football goalkeeper who played for Zaire in the 1974 FIFA World Cup. He also played for AS Vita Club.

Career
Born in Léopoldville, Ndimbi appeared in his team's second match in the 1974 World Cup against Yugoslavia. Zaire was 3–0 down, and they substituted goalkeeper Kazadi with Tubilandu in the 21st minute. This was the first instance of a goalkeeper substitution in the World Cup for any other reason than injury. Unfortunately, Tubilandu's first task was to put the ball off the net after Ivan Buljan's free kick was headed in by Josip Katalinski. Yugoslavia were 6–0 up by half time, and they eventually won 9–0.

As late as 1985, Tubilandu was still playing for Zaire, appearing in a 1986 African Cup of Nations qualifying match versus the Republic of the Congo in Brazzaville.

Tubilandu hailed from the Kinshasa commune of Matete. He retired from football in 1989. He died in the Clinique Ngaliema in Kinshasa on 17 June 2021, after a long period of illness.

References

External links
FIFA profile

1948 births
Footballers from Kinshasa
Africa Cup of Nations-winning players
Democratic Republic of the Congo footballers
Democratic Republic of the Congo international footballers
Association football goalkeepers
AS Vita Club players
1974 African Cup of Nations players
1974 FIFA World Cup players
2021 deaths